This is a partial list of learned societies, grouped by country.

International

European

Argentina

Armenia

Australia

Austria

Bangladesh

Belgium

Brazil

Canada

China

Czech Republic

Finland

France
 The 5 académies of the Institut de France:

Others

Germany

Ghana

Hungary

Hong Kong

India

Ireland

Italy

Japan

Malaysia

Montenegro

Netherlands

New Zealand

Nigeria

Pakistan

Papua New Guinea

Poland

Portugal

Republic of China (Taiwan)

Serbia

South Africa

South Korea

Spain
Royal Academies of the Instituto de España:

Sri Lanka

Sweden

Switzerland

Thailand

Tunisia

United Kingdom

United States

See also
 List of engineering societies
 List of international professional associations

Notes

References

Learned societies